A recluse is a person who lives in voluntary seclusion from the public and society. The word is from the Latin recludere, which means "shut up" or "sequester". Historically, the word referred to a Christian hermit's total isolation from the world, with examples including Symeon of Trier, who lived within the great Roman gate Porta Nigra with permission from the Archbishop of Trier, or Theophan the Recluse, the 19th-century Orthodox Christian monk who was later glorified as a saint. Many celebrated figures of human history have spent significant portions of their lives as recluses.

Causes
There are many potential reasons for becoming a recluse, including but not limited to: a personal philosophy may reject consumer society; a mystical religious outlook may involve becoming a hermit or an anchorite; a survivalist may be practicing self-sufficiency; a criminal might hide away from people to avoid detection by police; or a misanthrope may lack tolerance for society. In the Russian Orthodox and Catholic Church tradition, a Poustinik is a temporary hermit who has been called to pray and fast alone in a cabin for at least 24 hours. In ancient Chinese culture, scholars are encouraged to be a public servant in a scrupulous and well-run government but expected to go into reclusion as a yinshi (隐士, 'gentleman-in-hiding') when the government is rife with corruption. Others, like Dongfang Shuo, became hermits to practice Taoism, or in later centuries, Chan Buddhism.

It can also be due to psychological reasons, for example due to disorders such as posttraumatic stress disorder, social anxiety disorder, substance use disorder (including alcoholism), apathy, depression, obsessive–compulsive disorder, schizoid personality disorder, schizotypal personality disorder or avoidant personality disorder. Conditions like autism or intellectual disability can also lead people to become reclusive. In Japan, an estimated 1.2 million people are part of the phenomenon of "Hikikomori" or "social withdrawal", a problem often blamed on Japan's education system and social pressure to succeed.

Commentary
Entrepreneur Kim Smiley wrote, "We live in a society that stigmatizes seclusion, yet has an almost rabid fascination with it at the same time." Melanie Tannenbaum also noted in Pacific Standard that socially isolated children are "significantly less likely than their more social counterparts to engage in delinquent behavior during middle and high school". In Psychology Today, career coach Marty Nemko argued that the reclusive lifestyle is worthy of more consideration, stating that people who live alone are more likely to find satisfying work due to a lack of responsibility to support a family.

Notable recluses

See also

Anchorite
Asociality
Avoidant personality disorder
Hermit
Hikikomori
Loner
Outsider art
Recluse literature
Schizoid personality disorder
Singleton (lifestyle)
Social anxiety
Social isolation
Solitude
Wallflower (people)

Notes

References

Living arrangements
Anti-social behaviour

de:Einsiedler
sv:Enstöring